Calamoecia is a genus of copepods in the family Centropagidae confined to Australasia. It is thought to have evolved since the separation of the Australian continent from Antarctica. Three of the Australian endemic species are listed as vulnerable species on the IUCN Red List (marked VU in the list below). The genus contains the following species:

Calamoecia ampulla (Searle, 1911)
Calamoecia attenuata (Fairbridge, 1945)
Calamoecia australica G. O. Sars, 1908 
Calamoecia australis (Searle, 1911)
Calamoecia baylyi Timms, 2001
Calamoecia canberra Bayly, 1962
Calamoecia clitellata Bayly, 1962
Calamoecia elongata Bayly, 1979 
Calamoecia gibbosa (Brehm, 1950)
Calamoecia halsei Bayly, 1998
Calamoecia longicornis (Sars G.O., 1912)
Calamoecia lucasi Brady, 1906
Calamoecia salina (Nicholls, 1944)
Calamoecia steeli (Henry, 1924)
Calamoecia tasmanica (G. W. Smith, 1909)
Calamoecia trifida Bayly, 1961
Calamoecia trilobata Halse & McRae, 2001
Calamoecia ultima (Brehm, 1960)
Calamoecia viridis (Searle, 1911)
Calamoecia zeidleri Bayly, 1984

References

Centropagidae
Taxonomy articles created by Polbot